The University Press of New England (UPNE), located in Lebanon, New Hampshire and founded in 1970, was a university press consortium including Brandeis University, Dartmouth College (its host member), Tufts University, the University of New Hampshire, and Northeastern University. It shut in 2018 and in January 2021, Brandeis University became the sole owner of all titles and copyrights of UPNE, excluding Dartmouth College Press titles.

Notable fiction authors published by UPNE include Howard Frank Mosher, Roxana Robinson, Ernest Hebert, Cathie Pelletier, Chris Bohjalian, Percival Everett, Laurie Alberts and Walter D. Wetherell. Notable poets distributed by the press include Rae Armantrout, Claudia Rankine, James Tate, Mary Ruefle, Donald Revell, Ellen Bryant Voigt, James Wright, Jean Valentine, Stanley Kunitz, Heather McHugh, and Yusef Komunyakaa. Notable nature and environment authors published include William Sargent, Cynthia Huntington, David Gessner, John Hay, Tom Wessels and Eric Zencey. Notable scholarly authors published by UPNE and its members include Kathleen J. Ferraro, Jehuda Reinharz, Joyce Antler, Peter Gizzi, Mary Caroline Richards, Leslie Cannold, Colin Calloway, David Fishman, Diana Muir, and Gina Barreca. UPNE and its authors and titles have received many honors and awards including the National Book Award, Pulitzer Prize, Guggenheim Fellowships, NEA Literature Fellowships, and the Barnes & Noble Discovery Award.

The press published books for scholars, educators, students, and the general public, concentrating on American studies, literature, history, and cultural studies; art, architecture, and material culture; ethnic studies (African American, Jewish, Native American, Shaker, and international studies); nature and the environment; and New England history and culture. It published around sixty titles annually, and distributed titles for a number of other small and academic presses, museums and non-profit societies.

Distribution partners 
 All titles published by

 Academia Press
 Bibliopola Press
 CavanKerry Press
 Chipstone Foundation
 Four Way Books
 International Polar Institute
 Nightboat Books
 The Sheep Meadow Press
 Tagus Press
 Wesleyan University Press
 Winterthur Museum

 Selected titles published by

 Art Services International
 Hood Museum of Art
 Lyman Allyn Art Museum
 New Britain Museum of American Art
 Wadsworth Atheneum
 Winterthur Museum

Former imprints
 Brandeis University Press
 Dartmouth College Press
 ForeEdge
 Northeastern University Press
 Tufts University Press
 University of New Hampshire Press
 University of Vermont Press

See also

 List of English-language book publishing companies
 List of university presses

References

External links
 University Press of New England

New England
Publishing companies established in 1970
Non-profit organizations based in New Hampshire
Brandeis University
Dartmouth College
University of New Hampshire
Northeastern University
1970 establishments in New Hampshire